I Am Divine is a 2013 American documentary film produced and directed by Jeffrey Schwarz of the Los Angeles-based production company Automat Pictures. The documentary focuses on the American actor, singer and drag performer Divine (October 19, 1945 – March 7, 1988), born Harris Glenn Milstead, a lifelong friend and collaborator of filmmaker John Waters.

The film features extensive contemporary interviews with Waters, as well as Divine's mother Frances Milstead, and surviving members of the Dreamlanders.

Participants
 John Waters
 Tab Hunter
 Ricki Lake
 Mink Stole
 George Figgs
 Bruce Vilanch
 Lisa Jane Persky
 David DeCoteau
 Susan Lowe
 Mary Vivian Pearce
 Jackie Beat
 Peaches Christ
 Tammie Brown
 Michael Musto
 Holly Woodlawn

Archive footage
 Harris Glenn Milstead/Divine
 Edith Massey
 David Lochary
 Leo Ford
 George Masters
 Tally Brown
 Van Smith

Release
I Am Divine premiered at South by Southwest 2013, and had its premiere in Divine's hometown of Baltimore, Maryland as part of the Maryland Film Festival 2013.

Reception
The film garnered critical acclaim, holding a 96% "Certified Fresh" rating on Rotten Tomatoes based on 54 reviews; the general consensus states: "With warmth and affection, I Am Divine offers an engaging portrait of the complex personality behind a trailblazing cinematic figure." On Metacritic, the film has a 70/100 rating based on 13 critics, signifying "generally favorable reviews".

References

External links
 
 
 
 
 

2013 films
2013 documentary films
American documentary films
Documentary films about actors
Documentary films about singers
Films shot in Baltimore
Kickstarter-funded documentaries
Documentary films about LGBT film
LGBT culture in Baltimore
John Waters
Films directed by Jeffrey Schwarz
Drag (clothing)-related films
2013 LGBT-related films
Documentary films about LGBT topics
2010s English-language films
2010s American films